The Mežaparks Great Bandstand, also called the Song Festival Bandstand, Open-Air Stage, is a large open-air bandstand in Mežaparks park in the Mežaparks neighbourhood of Riga, the capital of Latvia. The bandstand has added cultural value to Riga since 1955, when the Latvian Song and Dance Festival was moved to this venue.

The bandstand was erected according to a project by architect and civil engineer Vladimir Schnitnikov. It lies in the northern part of Mežaparks, an area that mostly consists of pine forest. Within the cleared area of the forest, the bandstand lies in the northwestern corner, and the rest of the area has long wingshaped benches with seating for 30,000 spectators. There were up to 200,000 spectators attending the 1988 Latvian Song and Dance Festival.

The stage is an integral part of the Song and Dance Festival which is a unique feature of Latvian culture and a part of national identity. The key function of an open air stage is to keep the tradition of the Song Festival, which is included in the UNESCO cultural heritage list.

Reconstruction 

In mid-2007 Riga City Council announced a new – international – design competition. The competitors were expected to produce rational, structurally innovative and acoustically impeccable proposals for transformation of the stage what would include the roof with a system of acoustic elements, partial transformation of chorister stands, transformation of the spectator amphitheatre, construction of new stands at the rear part of the amphitheatre and installation of transformable spectator bench systems.

The winner of the International Sketch Competition for the Mežaparks Open-Air Stage Reconstruction were the Latvian Architects collaborative team - Mailitis Architects and Juris Poga's Bureau.

The Project reconstruction has been divided into two phases:

The first phase of the Open-Air Stage in Mežaparks reconstruction project involves reconstruction of the audience area for the 2018 Latvian Song and Dance Festival with audience field extension to 30,557 seats (23,000 seats before). Transformable audience field increased the capacity to 60,000 standing places. There is a two-level open zone for shops, restaurants and toilets under the audience area. The first phase of the project extends the existing building stage structure and partly attaches a temporary tribune for extra singers to fit 14,000 singers.

The first reconstruction phase was officially completed in June 2018.

The second reconstruction round will rebuild all open-air stage, a roof and modify building. Auxiliary premises will be built under the stage, including an exhibition hall and offices. It is planned to complete the project by 2023 when the 150th anniversary of the Latvian Song and Dance Festival is going to take place in Mezaparks. The project includes unique acoustic methods – 300 acoustic shields, and a special membrane protecting choristers from the sun and rain.

Completely finishing all the works, there will be 30,000 spectator seats, the total number of singers will be up to 14,000, with 11,000 singers positioned in the stands and 2,900 singers on the main stage. The architecture firms of Austra Mailitis and Juris Poga were awarded the 2021 Latvian Architecture Award for their contributions to the reconstruction project.

References

External links

Buildings and structures in Riga
Bandstands
Music venues in Latvia